Trophocosta aurea is a species of moth of the family Tortricidae. It is found on Borneo.

References

Moths described in 1966
Tortricini
Taxa named by Józef Razowski
Moths of Indonesia